Lake Mohawk is a private reservoir located about  south of Malvern, Ohio, USA and  east of Waynesburg, Ohio. It resides in Brown Township and Harrison Township. There is only one place to put in boats, however, there are 13 community  access docks that can hold boats. The lake is formed by Lake Mohawk Dam across Middle Run, a tributary of Sandy Creek. The lake is fed by a series of springs and rain water runoff.

Flora
The flora contained in the lake mostly amounts to Spirogyra and Curly-leaf Pondweed. Also in fall and winter months it may contain Scenedesmus and Microcystis. The weed coverage is Leafy Pondweed, Naiad, Eurasian Watermilfoil, and Sago Pondweed.

Fauna
Some types of fish that reside in the lake are Largemouth and Smallmouth bass, Crappie, Yellow perch, Bluegill, Walleye, sunfish, and 2 varieties of catfish, Mud Catfish and Blue catfish.  There is also a no-release policy on Alaskan Pike.

Lake community

The lake is inside a gated community which contains approximately 1,700 property lots that are privately owned. There are 3 beaches: Main Beach, West Beach and South Beach. The Main Beach has tennis courts nearby. The Main Beach also hosts a large pavilion and clubhouse that can be rented out, along with 3 smaller pavilions on the beach. The Main Beach has a large play area with swings and a jungle-gym. There is a designated swimming area along the shoreline of the beach. The Main Beach also holds the private ski club dock that is used by the Lake Mohawk Water Ski Club. Near the main gate entrance is the golf course which is a 9 hole, par 3 course. There is a small green fee to play. The 2010 census found 1,652 people in 669 occupied dwellings, with 315 vacant dwellings.

Surrounding communities
Outside of the Main Gate, but still part of lake property, is a recreational park that contains a baseball field, basketball court, shuffleboard courts, and biking trail. In addition to the Main Gate, there are also 2 other gates: Keno Road Gate and Lace Road Gate, that are only accessible with a key card. A guard house allows visitors in, thus contractors and shipping trucks may enter through the Main Gate only. Most children and teenagers go to Brown Local School District that contains one high school, one middle school and one elementary school.

References

http://lake-mohawk.org/

Mohawk
Bodies of water of Carroll County, Ohio
Tourist attractions in Carroll County, Ohio